RR Lyrae variables are periodic variable stars, commonly found in globular clusters. They are used as standard candles to measure (extra) galactic distances, assisting with the cosmic distance ladder.  This class is named after the prototype and brightest example, RR Lyrae.

They are pulsating horizontal branch stars of spectral class A or F, with a mass of around half the Sun's.  They are thought to have shed mass during the red-giant branch phase, and were once stars at around 0.8 solar masses.

In contemporary astronomy, a period-luminosity relation makes them good standard candles for relatively nearby targets, especially within the Milky Way and Local Group.  They are also frequent subjects in the studies of globular clusters and the chemistry (and quantum mechanics) of older stars.

Discovery and recognition

In surveys of globular clusters, these "cluster-type" variables were being rapidly identified in the mid-1890s, especially by E. C. Pickering.  Probably the first star definitely of RR Lyrae type found outside a cluster was U Leporis, discovered by J. Kapteyn in 1890.  The prototype star RR Lyrae was discovered prior to 1899 by Williamina Fleming, and reported by Pickering in 1900 as "indistinguishable from cluster-type variables".

From 1915 to the 1930s, the RR Lyraes became increasingly accepted as a class of star distinct from the classical Cepheids, due to their shorter periods, differing locations within the galaxy, and chemical differences.  RR Lyrae variables are metal-poor, Population II stars.

RR Lyraes have proven difficult to observe in external galaxies because of their intrinsic faintness.  (In fact, Walter Baade's failure to find them in the Andromeda Galaxy led him to suspect that the galaxy was much farther away than predicted, to reconsider the calibration of Cepheid variables, and to propose the concept of stellar populations.)  Using the Canada-France-Hawaii Telescope in the 1980s, Pritchet & van den Bergh found RR Lyraes in Andromeda's galactic halo and, more recently, in its globular clusters.

Classification
The RR Lyrae stars are conventionally divided into three main types, following classification by S.I. Bailey based on the shape of the stars' brightness curves:
 RRab variables are the most common, making up 91% of all observed RR Lyrae, and display the steep rises in brightness typical of RR Lyrae
 RRc are less common, making up 9% of observed RR Lyrae, and have shorter periods and more sinusoidal variation
 RRd are rare, making up between <1% and 30% of RR Lyrae in a system, and are double-mode pulsators, unlike RRab and RRc

Distribution

RR Lyrae stars were formerly called "cluster variables" because of their strong (but not exclusive) association with globular clusters; conversely, over 80% of all variables known in globular clusters are RR Lyraes.  RR Lyrae stars are found at all galactic latitudes, as opposed to classical Cepheids, which are strongly associated with the galactic plane.

Because of their old age, RR Lyraes are commonly used to trace certain populations in the Milky Way, including the halo and thick disk.

Several times as many RR Lyraes are known as all Cepheids combined; in the 1980s, about 1900 were known in globular clusters.  Some estimates have about 85,000 in the Milky Way.

Though binary star systems are common for typical stars, RR Lyrae are very rarely observed in pairs.

Properties
RR Lyrae stars pulse in a manner similar to Cepheid variables, but the nature and histories of these stars is thought to be rather different.  Like all variables on the Cepheid instability strip, pulsations are caused by the κ-mechanism, when the opacity of ionised helium varies with its temperature.

RR Lyraes are old, relatively low mass, Population II stars, in common with W Virginis and BL Herculis variables, the type II Cepheids.  Classical Cepheid variables are higher mass population I stars.  RR Lyrae variables are much more common than Cepheids, but also much less luminous. The average absolute magnitude of an RR Lyrae star is about +0.75, only 40 or 50 times brighter than the Sun. Their period is shorter, typically less than one day, sometimes ranging down to seven hours. Some RRab stars, including RR Lyrae itself, exhibit the Blazhko effect in which there is a conspicuous phase and amplitude modulation.

Period-luminosity relationships

Unlike Cepheid variables, RR Lyrae variables do not follow a strict period-luminosity relationship at visual wavelengths, although they do in the infrared K band.  They are normally analysed using a period-colour-relationship, for example using a Wesenheit function.  In this way, they can be used as standard candles for distance measurements although there are difficulties with the effects of metallicity, faintness, and blending.  The effect of blending can impact RR Lyrae variables sampled near the cores of globular clusters, which are so dense that in low-resolution observations multiple (unresolved) stars may appear as a single target.  Thus the brightness measured for that seemingly single star (e.g., an RR Lyrae variable) is erroneously too bright, given those unresolved stars contributed to the brightness determined. Consequently, the computed distance is wrong, and certain researchers have argued that the blending effect can introduce a systematic uncertainty into the cosmic distance ladder, and may bias the estimated age of the Universe and the Hubble constant.

Recent developments
The Hubble Space Telescope has identified several RR Lyrae candidates in globular clusters of the Andromeda Galaxy and has measured the distance to the prototype star RR Lyrae.

The Kepler space telescope provided accurate photometric coverage of a single field at regular intervals over an extended period.  37 known RR Lyrae variables lie within the Kepler field, including RR Lyrae itself, and new phenomena such as period-doubling have been detected.

The Gaia mission mapped 140,784 RR Lyrae stars, of which 50,220 were not previously known to be variable, and for which 54,272 interstellar absorption estimates are available.

References

External links 
APOD M3: Inconstant Star Cluster four-frame animation of RR Lyrae variables in globular cluster M3
Animation of RR Lyrae-Variables in globular cluster M15
Animation with the variable stars RR Lyrae in the center area of the globular cluster M15
RR Lyrae stars
AAVSO Variable Star of the Season - RR Lyrae
OGLE Atlas of Variable Star Light Curves - RR Lyrae stars

Standard candles
 
Variable stars